Irish Destiny is a 1926 film made in the Irish Free State, directed by George Dewhurst and written by Isaac Eppel to mark the tenth anniversary of the Easter Rising. A cut version was released in Britain, entitled An Irish Mother.

The film was considered lost for many years until in 1991 a single surviving nitrate print was located by the Irish Film Institute in the United States' Library of Congress. The institute's archive had the film transferred to safety stock and restored. The institute then commissioned Mícheál Ó Súilleabháin to write a new score for the film.

Irish Destiny is the first fiction film that deals with the Irish War of Independence, and the first and only film written and produced by Isaac (Jack) Eppel, a Jewish Dublin GP and pharmacist who also enjoyed a career as theater impresario and cinema owner.

Cast
 Paddy Dunne Cullinan as Denis O'Hara
 Frances Macnamarra as Moira Barry, a schoolteacher and Denis' fiancée
 Daisy Campbell as Mrs. O'Hara, Denis' mother
 Clifford Pembroke as Mr. O'Hara, Denis' father
 Brian Magowan as Gilbert Beecher, a gang leader of the poteen-makers
 Cathal MacGarvey as Shanahan, a jarvey
 Evelyn Henchey as Kitty Shanahan's daughter
 Kit O'Malley as Captain Kelly, commandant, Clonmore Battalion, IRA
Val Vousden as Priest
 Tom Flood as Intelligence Officer, IRA headquarters
 Derek Eppel as  Schoolboy
 Simon Eppel as man with cigar at Vaughan's Hotel

References

External links

Cornerhouse article
Irish Destiny on DVD

1926 films

English-language Irish films
Silent films
Irish War of Independence films
Films set in Ireland
Films shot in Dublin (city)
Films directed by George Dewhurst
1920s rediscovered films
Irish black-and-white films
Rediscovered Irish films
Films shot in County Wicklow
1920s English-language films